Catherine Trudeau (born May 4, 1975) is a Canadian actress.  She was born in L'Assomption, Quebec, Canada.

Filmography 
 1995 : 4 et demi... (TV) : Nancy Fugère (2000)
 2000 : Hochelaga : Louise
 2001 : Tar Angel (L'Ange de goudron) : Huguette
 2001 : The Pig's Law (La Loi du cochon) : Bettie Brousseau
 2002 : Tabou (TV) : Sarah
 2002 : Séraphin: Heart of Stone (Séraphin: un homme et son péché) : Simone
 2002 : Réal-TV (série TV) : Patricia (2002)
 2005 : The Outlander (Le Survenant) : Alphonsine Beauchemin (Phonsine)
 2005 : Instant Idol (Idole instantanée) : Sophie
 2005 : Aurore : Sœur Anna
 2005 : Les Invincibles (TV) : Lyne Boisvert
 2006 : François en série (TV) : Maude
 2006 : Family History (Histoire de famille) : Manon
 2007 : Les Invincibles II (TV) : Lyne Boisvert
 2009 : Les Invincibles III (TV) : Lyne Boisvert
 2010: The Child Prodigy (L'Enfant prodige)
 2015: Snowtime! (La Guerre des tuques 3D) - Jacques
 2020: Underground (Souterrain)

Awards and nominations

Awards

Nominations 

 2002 : Jutra Award for best actress in L'Ange de goudron
Nomination for best supporting actress in 2006 for Le Survenant

External links 
 IMDB Page

1975 births
Canadian film actresses
Canadian television actresses
French Quebecers
People from Lanaudière
Living people